Stephen Hinton (born 1955, London, England) is a British-American musicologist at Stanford University. His most recent book, Weill's Musical Theater: Stages of Reform (University of California Press: Berkeley, 2012), the first musicological study of Weill's complete stage works, received the 2013 Kurt Weill Book Prize for outstanding scholarship in music theater since 1900. The reviewer for the Journal of the American Musicological Society described the book as "a landmark in the literature on twentieth-century musical theater."

Academic career

Hinton graduated from the University of Birmingham (UK) with a BA in Music and German in 1978, and with a PhD in Musicology in 1984. He is currently the Avalon Foundation Professor in the Humanities at Stanford University, Professor of Music and, by courtesy, of German. He also serves as the Denning Family Director of the Stanford Arts Institute. From 2006–2010 he was Senior Associate Dean for Humanities & Arts, and from 1997–2004 chairman of the Department of Music.  Before moving to Stanford, he taught at Yale University and, before that, at the Technische Universität Berlin. At the TU Berlin he held positions as Tutor in Musicology (1982–84), research assistant to Carl Dahlhaus (1984–86), postdoctoral scholar of the Deutsche Forschungsgemeinschaft (1986–88) and wissenschaftlicher Assistent (1988–90).

Selected publications

The Idea of Gebrauchsmusik (New York: Garland, 1989)
Kurt Weill: The Threepenny Opera (Cambridge Opera Handbooks, Cambridge: Cambridge University Press, 1990)
"Natürliche Übergänge: Heinrich Schenkers Begriff von der Sonatenform", Musiktheorie, 4 (1990): 101–16
Gebrauchsmusik (= Handwörterbuch der musikalischen Terminologie, Auslieferung 15, Wiesbaden, 1988; reprinted in Terminologie der Musik im 20. Jahrhundert, ed. H.H. Eggebrecht, Wiesbaden, 1995)
Neue Sachlichkeit (= Handwörterbuch der musikalischen Terminologie, Auslieferung 18, Wiesbaden, 1990; reprinted in Terminologie der Musik im 20. Jahrhundert, ed. H.H. Eggebrecht, Wiesbaden, 1995)
Paul Hindemith, Orchesterwerke 1932–34: Philharmonisches Konzert; Symphonie Mathis der Maler (= Complete Works II/2, Schott: Mainz, 1991)
"Defining Musical Expressionism: Schoenberg and Others", Expressionism Reassessed, ed. S. Behr, et al. (Manchester, 1993), 121–9
"Adorno's Unfinished Beethoven", Beethoven Forum 5 (Lincoln and London: University of Nebraska Press, 1996), 139–53
"Hanns Eisler and the Ideology of Modern Music", New Music and Ideology, ed. M. Delaere (Wilhelmshaven, 1996), 79–85
"Adorno's philosophy of music", in Oxford Encyclopedia of Aesthetics, ed. M. Kelly (Oxford, 1998)
"Not Which Tones? The Crux of Beethoven's Ninth", in 19th-Century Music, 22:1 (1998): 61–77
"Hindemith, Bach and the Melancholy of Obligation", in Bach Perspectives 3: Creative Responses to Bach from Mozart to Hindemith. (University of Nebraska Press, 1998),  133-15; reprinted in Hindemith-Jahrbuch 1998
(with Jürgen Schebera) Kurt Weill, Musik und Theater: Gesammelte Schriften (Berlin, 1990); revised and expanded edition published as Musik und musikalisches Theater: Gesammelte Schriften (Mainz: Schott, 2000)
Analyse statt Ästhetik (= Funkkolleg Musik: Studieneinheit 24, Mainz, 1988; rev. and repr. in Europäische Musikgeschichte, ed. L. Finscher et al., Kassel: Bärenreiter, 2002)
Wider das bürgerliche Konzertleben (= Funkkolleg Musik: Studieneinheit 25, Mainz, 1988; rev. and repr. in Europäische Musikgeschichte, ed. L. Finscher et al., Kassel: Bärenreiter, 2002)
"Romantische Ironie in der Musik?" Beiträge zur Kleist-Forschung, 16 (Frankfurt Oder: Kleist-Museum, 2002), 21–35 
"Zur Epistemologie des Ursatzes", Musik und Verstehen, ed. Christoph von Blumröder and W. Steinbeck (Laaber: Laaber Verlag, 2004), 74–83
(with Edward Harsh) Kurt Weill, Die Dreigroschenoper, Kurt Weill Edition I/5 (Miami: European American Music, 2000); published in a revised edition as study score with a new Preface (Vienna: Universal-Edition, 2006)
"The Emancipation of Dissonance: Schoenberg's Two Practices of Composition", Music & Letters, 91, no. 4 (2010): 568–79
"Schoenberg's Harmonielehre: Psychology and Comprehensibility", Tonality 1900–1950: Concept and Practice, ed. F. Wörner, U. Scheideler and P. Rupprecht (Steiner: Stuttgart, 2012), 113–24.
Weill's Musical Theater: Stages of Reform (Berkeley, University of California Press, 2012)

References

External links
 Personal web page
 Stanford University Arts Institute web page
 Stanford Department of Music

1955 births
Living people
Stanford University faculty
English musicologists
Alumni of the University of Birmingham